Nová Ves may refer to places:

Czech Republic
Nová Ves (Brno-Country District), a municipality and village in the South Moravian Region
Nová Ves (České Budějovice District), a municipality and village in the South Bohemian Region
Nová Ves (Český Krumlov District), a municipality and village in the South Bohemian Region
Nová Ves (Domažlice District), a municipality and village in the Plzeň Region
Nová Ves (Liberec District), a municipality and village in the Liberec Region
Nová Ves (Louny District), a municipality and village in the Ústí nad Labem Region
Nová Ves (Mělník District), a municipality and village in the Central Bohemian Region
Nová Ves (Plzeň-South District), a municipality and village in the Plzeň Region
Nová Ves (Prague-East District), a municipality and village in the Central Bohemian Region
Nová Ves (Rychnov nad Kněžnou District), a municipality and village in the Hradec Králové Region
Nová Ves (Sokolov District), a municipality and village in the Karlovy Vary Region
Nová Ves (Strakonice District), a municipality and village in the South Bohemian Region
Nová Ves (Třebíč District), a municipality and village in the Vysočina Region
Nová Ves (Žďár nad Sázavou District), a municipality and village in the Vysočina Region
Nová Ves pod Pleší, a municipality and village in the Central Bohemian Region
Modrá (formerly known as Nová Ves), a municipality and village in the Zlín Region
Moravská Nová Ves, a market town in the South Moravian Region
Ostrožská Nová Ves, a municipality and village in the Zlín Region

Slovakia
Nová Ves (Slovakia), a municipality and village in the Banská Bystrica Region